Reginald "Leo" McKern, AO (16 March 1920 – 23 July 2002) was an Australian actor who appeared in numerous British, Australian and American television programmes and films, and in more than 200 stage roles. His notable roles include Clang in Help! (1965), Thomas Cromwell in A Man for All Seasons (1966), Tom Ryan in Ryan's Daughter (1970), Paddy Button in The Blue Lagoon (1980), Dr. Grogan in The French Lieutenant's Woman (1981), Father Imperius in Ladyhawke (1985), and the role that made him a household name as an actor, Horace Rumpole, whom he played in the British television series Rumpole of the Bailey. He also portrayed Carl Bugenhagen in the first and second instalments of The Omen series and Number Two in the TV series The Prisoner.

Early life
Reginald McKern was born in Sydney, New South Wales, the son of Vera (née Martin) and Norman Walton McKern. Known as "Leo" from a young age, he attended Sydney Technical High School. On leaving school, he initially worked in a factory, where at the age of 15, he suffered an accident which resulted in the removal of his left eye. He first worked as an engineering apprentice, then as an artist, followed by service as a sapper with the Australian Army's Royal Australian Engineers during World War II. In 1944, in Sydney, he performed in his first stage role.

Career

Theatre
McKern fell in love with Australian actress Jane Holland, moved to the United Kingdom to be with her, and married her in 1946. He soon became a regular performer at London's Old Vic theatre and the Shakespeare Memorial Theatre (now the Royal Shakespeare Theatre) in Stratford-upon-Avon, despite the difficulties posed by his glass eye and Australian accent.

McKern's most notable Shakespearean role was as Iago in Othello, in 1952. In 1955 he appeared in "The Burnt Flower Bed" by Ugo Betti directed by Peter Hall at the Arts Theatre Club in London. He played Big Daddy in Peter Hall's production of Cat on a Hot Tin Roof at the Comedy Theatre in 1958 and went on to play the German ambassador in another Peter Hall production, Brouhaha starring Peter Sellers at the Aldwych Theatre. He originated the role of Common Man in Robert Bolt's A Man for All Seasons in the West End in 1960, but for the show's Broadway production appeared as Thomas Cromwell, 1st Earl of Essex, a role he would reprise for the 1966 film version. He also portrayed Subtle in Ben Jonson's The Alchemist in 1962. In 1965, he played the lead in Bolt's The Thwarting of Baron Bolligrew, and Disson in Harold Pinter's Tea Party.

He appeared at the Royal Exchange, Manchester in Uncle Vanya in 1977 and in Crime and Punishment in 1978.

In 1989, he played James Boswell in the one-man show, Boswell for the Defence in theatres in Melbourne, Hong Kong and London.

Film
McKern's film debut was in Murder in the Cathedral (1952). His more notable film appearances included the science-fiction classics X the Unknown (1956), The Day the Earth Caught Fire (1961), the World War I drama King and Country (1964), Help! (1965), the Academy Award-winning adaptation of A Man for All Seasons (1966), The Shoes of the Fisherman (1968), Ryan's Daughter (1970), Massacre in Rome (1973), The Adventure of Sherlock Holmes' Smarter Brother (1975), The Omen (1976), The Blue Lagoon (1980), The French Lieutenant's Woman (1981) and Ladyhawke (1985). He was presented with the Australian Film Institute Award for Best Actor in a Leading Role for Travelling North (1987). In Monsignor Quixote (1985), he co-starred as Sancho Zancas opposite Alec Guinness as Father Quixote.

Television
One of McKern's earliest television roles was in the 1950s black-and-white series The Adventures of Robin Hood (as Sir Roger DeLisle, usurper of the Locksley manor and lands, and Herbert of Doncaster, a corrupt moneylender). During the 1960s, he was one of several Number Twos in the TV series The Prisoner. Along with Colin Gordon, McKern was one of only two actors to play Number Two more than once. He first played the character in the episodes "The Chimes of Big Ben" and "Once Upon a Time", and reprised the role in the final episode, "Fall Out". The filming of "Once Upon a Time" was a particularly intense experience for McKern; according to one biographer, the stress caused him to suffer either a nervous breakdown or a heart attack (accounts differ), forcing production to stop for a time. In 1976, McKern narrated and presented The Battle of the Somme, a British Broadcasting Corporation documentary marking the 60th anniversary of the World War I battle. He played the Earl of Gloucester in Granada Television's production of King Lear (1983). Also in 1983, he starred in episodes of the mini-series Reilly, Ace of Spies as 'Zaharov', director of Vickers.

Rumpole of the Bailey
In 1975, McKern made his first appearance in the role that would make him a household name as an actor, Horace Rumpole, whom he played in Rumpole of the Bailey, originally an episode of the BBC's Play for Today. A series of the same name, comprising 44 episodes, was produced for ITV between 1978 and 1992. According to Rumpole's creator, author John Mortimer, McKern "not only played the character Rumpole—he added to it, brightened it and brought it fully to life."

Although he enjoyed the role, McKern expressed doubts about its popularity and the extent to which his life was becoming intertwined with Rumpole's. "McKern was often unhappy, decrying his television fame as an "insatiable monster". He stressed that his Peer Gynt was a greater performance and lamented: "If I get an obit in any paper, they will say, '.. of course, known to millions as Rumpole.'" In the later series, his daughter Abigail McKern joined the cast as Liz Probert.

Commercial work
Starting in 1985, McKern appeared in a series of advertisements for Lloyds Bank, playing the upholder of quality standards. In 1987, investment firm Smith Barney selected McKern to succeed John Houseman as its spokesman. The move was part of a broader shift in their TV commercials, including hiring Dinah Sheridan to play McKern's wife. In 1989, Smith Barney again changed spokesmen, dropping McKern for American actor George C. Scott.

Radio
McKern wrote one radio play, London Story, which became the film Chain of Events (1958). He also provided the voice of Captain Haddock in the 1992 and 1993 BBC Radio adaptation of Hergé's The Adventures of Tintin.

Personal life
In 1983, McKern was appointed an Officer of the Order of Australia for his services to the performing arts.

He frequently travelled between England and Australia, both to visit family and friends and to appear in various films and plays. As he was frightened of flying, he booked tickets to travel on cargo ships. This gave him time and peace to read scripts and contracts, with the added benefit of feeling he was on holiday.

Worried that his stout frame would not appeal to audiences, McKern suffered from stage fright, which became harder to control with age.

In 1997 he appeared in a party political broadcast for the United Kingdom Independence Party.

McKern and his wife, fellow Australian actor Jane Holland (A Son is Born, 1946), had two daughters, Abigail and Harriet.

Suffering in his final years from ill health, McKern moved into a nursing home near Bath in Somerset in 2002, where he died a few weeks later, on July 23, at the age of 82; his body was cremated at Haycombe Cemetery in Bath.

Selected filmography

 Murder in the Cathedral (1952) – Third Knight
 All for Mary (1955) – Gaston Nikopopoulos
 The Adventures of Robin Hood (1955, TV Series) – Herbert of Doncaster / Sir Roger de Lisle
 X the Unknown (1956) – Police Inspector McGill
 Time Without Pity (1957) – Robert Stanford
 Confess, Killer (1957) – Lt. Kolski (with Naomi Chance)
 A Tale of Two Cities (1958) – Attorney General
 Web of Evidence (1959) – McEvoy
 Yesterday's Enemy (1959) – Max
 The Mouse That Roared (1958) – Benter, Leader of the Opposition
 The Running Jumping & Standing Still Film (1959) – (uncredited)
 Scent of Mystery (1960) – Tommy Kennedy
 Jazz Boat (1960) – Inspector
 Saturday Playhouse (1960, Episode: "The Man Who Came to Dinner") – Sheridan Whiteside
 Mr. Topaze (1961) – Muche
 The Day the Earth Caught Fire (1961) – Bill Maguire
 The Amazing Dr. Clitterhouse (1962) – Dr. Clitterhouse
 The Inspector (1962) – Brandt
 Doctor in Distress (1963) – Harry Heilbronn
 Hot Enough for June (1964) – Simoneva
 A Jolly Bad Fellow (1964) – Professor Kerris Bowles-Ottery
 King & Country (1964) – Captain O'Sullivan
 The Amorous Adventures of Moll Flanders (1965) – Squint
 Help! (1965) – High Priest Clang
 Alice in Wonderland (1966, TV Movie – Jonathan Miller's 1966 television adaptation) – Duchess
 A Man for All Seasons (1966, both Cromwell and Common Man in original play) – Thomas Cromwell 
 The Prisoner (1967, Episodes: "The Chimes of Big Ben", "Once Upon a Time" and "Fall Out") – Number Two
 Assignment K (1968) – Smith
 Nobody Runs Forever (1968) – Flannery (uncredited)
 Decline and Fall... of a Birdwatcher (1968) – Captain Grimes
 The Shoes of the Fisherman (1968) – Cardinal Leone
 Ryan's Daughter (1970) – Thomas Ryan
 Massacre in Rome (1973) – General Kurt Mälzer
 The Adventure of Sherlock Holmes' Smarter Brother (1975) – Professor Moriarty
 Play for Today (1975, Episode: "Rumpole of The Bailey") – Horace Rumpole
 Space: 1999 (1976, Episode: "The Infernal Machine") – Companion / Voice of Gwent
 The Omen (1976) – Carl Bugenhagen (uncredited)
 Candleshoe (1977) – Harry Bundage
 Damien: Omen II (1978) – Carl Bugenhagen (uncredited)
 Rumpole of the Bailey (1978–1992, TV Series) – Horace Rumpole
 The Nativity (1978, TV Movie) – Herod the Great
 The Blue Lagoon (1980) – Paddy Button
 The French Lieutenant's Woman (1981) – Dr Grogan
 Reilly, Ace of Spies (1983) – Basil Zaharoff
 King Lear (1983) – Earl of Gloucester
 The Chain (1984) – Thomas
 Murder with Mirrors  (1985) – Inspector Curry
 Ladyhawke (1985) – Imperius
 Monsignor Quixote (1987) – Sancho Zancas
 Travelling North (1987) – Frank
 A Foreign Field (1993) – Cyril
 Dad and Dave: On Our Selection (1995) – Dad (Joseph) Rudd
 Molokai: The Story of Father Damien (1999) – Bishop Maigret (final film role)

References

External links
 
 
 
 
 

1920 births
2002 deaths
20th-century Australian male actors
Male actors from Sydney
Australian expatriate actors
Australian emigrants to England
Australian male film actors
Australian Army personnel of World War II
Australian male radio actors
Australian male stage actors
Australian male television actors
Australian male voice actors
Best Actor AACTA Award winners
Deaths from diabetes
Officers of the Order of Australia
People educated at Sydney Technical High School
Royal Shakespeare Company members
Spokespersons
Australian Army soldiers